Adrian Palmer may refer to:

 Adrian Palmer, 4th Baron Palmer
 Adrian Palmer, a member of the New Zealand band Zed